Cancer-related fatigue is a symptom of fatigue that is experienced by nearly all cancer patients.

Among patients receiving cancer treatment other than surgery, it is essentially universal.  Fatigue is a normal and expected side effect of most forms of chemotherapy, radiation therapy, and biotherapy.  On average, cancer-related fatigue is "more severe, more distressing, and less likely to be relieved by rest" than fatigue experienced by healthy people.  It can range from mild to severe, and may be either temporary or a long-term effect.

Fatigue may be a symptom of the cancer, or it may be the result of treatments for the cancer.

Pathophysiology
The pathophysiology of cancer-related fatigue is poorly understood.  It may be caused by the cancer or the effects it has on the body, by the body's response to the cancer, or by the cancer treatments.

Fatigue is a common symptom of cancer.

Some fatigue is caused by cancer treatments.  This may show a characteristic pattern.  For example, people on many chemotherapy regimens often feel more fatigue in the week after treatments, and less fatigue as they recover from that round of medications.  People receiving radiation therapy, by contrast, often find their fatigue steadily increases until the end of treatment.

Proposed mechanisms by which cancer can cause fatigue include an increase in pro-inflammatory cytokines, dysregulation of the hypothalamic-pituitary-adrenal axis, disruption of circadian rhythms, muscle loss and cancer wasting, and genetic problems.  Additionally, some forms of cancer may cause fatigue through more direct mechanisms, such as a leukemia that causes anemia by preventing the bone marrow from producing blood cells efficiently.  A relationship between Interleukin 6 and fatigue has been observed in studies, albeit inconsistently.  Increased markers of sympathetic nervous system activity are also associated with cancer related fatigue.

Screening
The National Comprehensive Cancer Network recommends that every cancer patient be systematically screened for fatigue at the first visit with an oncologist, throughout treatment, and afterwards.  Screening typically involves a simple question, like "On a scale of one to ten, how tired have you felt during the last week?"

More detailed information may be collected in a symptom journal.

Diagnosis
Some causes of cancer-related fatigue are treatable, and evaluation is directed towards identifying these treatable causes.  Treatable causes of cancer-related fatigue include: anemia, pain, emotional distress, sleep disturbances, nutritional disturbances, decreased physical fitness and activity, side effects from medications (e.g., sedatives), abuse of alcohol or other substances.  Additionally, other medical conditions, such as infections, heart disease, or endocrine dysfunction (e.g., hot flashes), can cause fatigue, and may also need treatment.

Definition
The National Comprehensive Cancer Network defines cancer-related fatigue as "a distressing persistent, subjective sense of physical, emotional and/or cognitive tiredness or exhaustion related to cancer or cancer treatment that is not proportional to recent activity and interferes with usual functioning".

Cancer-related fatigue is a chronic fatigue (persistent fatigue not relieved by rest), but it is not related to chronic fatigue syndrome.

Management
Treatment depends on the patient's overall situation.  A patient who is in active treatment may have different priorities than a person who has completed treatment, or who is at the end of life.

Some management strategies may help all patients and could be supported by the work of an Occupational Therapist.  These include scheduling high-priority tasks during the patient's best time of day, using labor-saving devices, delegating tasks to caregivers, and avoiding unimportant activities, so that the patient will have more energy available for other activities.

Patients who are not at the end of life may benefit from physical exercise or physical therapy.  Engaging in moderate activity reduces fatigue.

While antidepressants are ineffective at reducing fatigue in non-depressed cancer patients, psychostimulants such as methylphenidate and amphetamines may reduce fatigue in some patients.

At the end of life, fatigue is usually associated with other symptoms, especially anemia, side effects from many medications and previous treatments, and poor nutritional status.  Pain, difficulty breathing, and fatigue form a common symptom cluster.  Fatigue often increases as patients with advanced cancer approach death.  As a result, people who are dying often sleep much more than a healthy person.

Addressing specific causes
If the fatigue is caused or exacerbated by a specific medical condition, such as anemia, then treatment of that medical condition should reduce the fatigue.

 Anemia:  Loss of oxygen-carrying red blood cells is a common cause of fatigue.  Medications to improve blood production or blood transfusions frequently reduce fatigue.
 Pain:  A variety of approaches to managing cancer pain may be used, particularly analgesic medications.
 Emotional distress:  Anxiety and depression are strongly associated with fatigue in cancer patients.  Psychosocial treatments directed at reducing stress and increasing coping skills may reduce fatigue.  Additionally, some patients in active treatment worry that the fatigue indicates treatment failure, and this anxiety may increase their fatigue in a vicious cycle.  Education about fatigue as a normal side effect can reassure the patient.  Up to 25% of cancer patients will experience depression.
 Sleep disturbances:  Patients who do not sleep well are more tired than others.  Cancer patients commonly experience insomnia or hypersomnia.  Sleep disturbances may be caused by sleeping too much during the day, by restless leg syndrome, by pain, by anxiety, or by other medical conditions, like obstructive sleep apnea or menopause.  Practicing good sleep hygiene may reduce fatigue by improving sleep quality.
 Nutritional disturbances:  Patients may have difficulty eating, may not be absorbing food well, or may have chosen an extreme diet as an alternative cancer treatment.  Loss of appetite, diarrhea and vomiting may result in the patient consuming too few calories or becoming dehydrated.
 Lack of physical activity: Decreased physical activity can make fatigue worse by reducing endurance and muscle strength. Participating in regular aerobic and muscle-strengthening physical activity both during and after cancer treatment may reduce cancer-related fatigue. Current physical activity guidelines recommend adults with cancer to engage in at least 150 minutes per week of moderate- intensity or 75 minutes per week of vigorous-intensity aerobic physical activity, or an equivalent combination. It is also recommended to perform muscle-strengthening physical activity two to three times a week, although there are studies showing that aerobic training is better at mitigating symptoms of cancer-related fatigue and reduces the risk of post exercise malaise. Physical activities should be tailored to individual needs and physical abilities.
 Side effects from medications:  Fatigue and sleepiness are known side effects with some kinds of medications.  Sometimes a change of medication, the dose, or the timing of the medication may result in less fatigue.  For example, an antihistamine might be taken shortly before sleep, rather than in the middle of the day.
 Substance abuse:  Alcohol, marijuana, and many other drugs can produce fatigue as a side effect. 
 Other medical conditions:  Cancer and its treatment usually put intense physical stress on the body, which can exacerbate other medical conditions.  Additionally, fatigue may result from an infection.

Prognosis
Fatigue caused by the cancer or its treatment often resolves if treatment is successful.  However, some patients experience long-term or chronic fatigue.  When strict definitions are used, about 20% of long-term, disease-free cancer survivors report fatigue.  Under looser definitions, up to half of cancer survivors report fatigue.  However, these studies are largely limited to patients with breast cancer, or peripheral stem cell transplant or bone marrow transplant patients, and the incidence may be different for survivors of other cancers.

Experiencing fatigue before treatment, being depressed or anxious, getting too little exercise, and having other medical conditions are all associated with higher levels of fatigue in post-treatment cancer survivors.  Receiving multiple types of treatments, such as chemotherapy and radiation, is associated with more fatigue.  Older adults have a higher risk of long-term fatigue.

Cancer-related fatigue after treatment for childhood cancer. 
Cancer-related fatigue has consistently been found to be one of the most prevalent and distressing symptoms in childhood cancer survivors.  The International Late Effects of Childhood Cancer Guidelines Harmonization Group (IGHG) has published recommendations regarding the surveillance of fatigue in survivors of childhood cancer.  These recommendations include regular screenings of fatigue in survivors of childhood cancer. Survivors of pediatric brain tumors report more fatigue after end of treatment than survivors of acute lymphoblastic leukemia, but both groups experience more fatigue than healthy children and adolescents. While considered a long-term effect of the treatment, children and adolescents experience fatigue already during the treatment for acute lymphoblastic leukemia and this side-effect of treatment remains in some patients after the treatment has ended.

References 

Paraneoplastic syndromes